Euzophera subcribrella is a species of snout moth in the genus Euzophera. It was described by Ragonot in 1887. It is found in Spain and Turkmenistan.

The wingspan is about 18 mm.

References

Moths described in 1887
Phycitini
Moths of Europe
Moths of Asia